Arhyssus is a genus of scentless plant bugs in the family Rhopalidae. There are about 14 described species in Arhyssus.

Species
 Arhyssus barberi Harris, 1942
 Arhyssus confusus Chopra, 1968
 Arhyssus crassus Harris, 1942
 Arhyssus distinctus Chopra, 1968
 Arhyssus hirtus (Torre-Bueno, 1912)
 Arhyssus lateralis (Say, 1825)
 Arhyssus longirostris Chopra, 1968
 Arhyssus nigristernum (Signoret, 1859)
 Arhyssus parvicornis (Signoret, 1859)
 Arhyssus punctatus (Signoret, 1859)
 Arhyssus schaeferi Chopra, 1968
 Arhyssus scutatus (Stål, 1859)
 Arhyssus usingeri Harris, 1942
 Arhyssus validus (Uhler, 1893)

References

 Thomas J. Henry, Richard C. Froeschner. (1988). Catalog of the Heteroptera, True Bugs of Canada and the Continental United States. Brill Academic Publishers.

Further reading

 Arnett, Ross H. (2000). American Insects: A Handbook of the Insects of America North of Mexico. CRC Press.

Rhopalinae
Pentatomomorpha genera